The TFI Leap Card is a contactless smart card for automated fare collection overseen by Transport for Ireland (TFI). It was introduced in the Greater Dublin area in 2011 for Luas, DART, Iarnród Éireann and Dublin Bus, but acceptance has significantly expanded, and it is now accepted in cities nationwide and on some longer distance commuter routes. Initially, Leap Cards offered only a pre-paid electronic wallet system for single-trip fares; since May 2014, it has also been possible to load it with weekly, monthly and annual subscriptions. In September 2017, there were over 2.5 million Leap Card users according to the National Transport Authority. The Leap Card is the result of many years' work by the Railway Procurement Agency and the National Transport Authority as part of the rollout of an integrated ticketing scheme for public transport in Dublin city.  Fares are generally discounted compared to cash prices, and integrated ticketing is offered in the Dublin area via a flat fare system across all modes of transport. The minimum top-up for the card is currently €5, and it can be topped up via iPhone/Android App, at LUAS or DART ticketing machines, and in convenience stores offering Payzone services.

History
The Railway Procurement Agency, now part of Transport Infrastructure Ireland, was responsible for the development of light railway and metro infrastructure and developing an integrated smart card system. First plans were made at the end of the last century and initially it was planned to introduce an integrated card when the Luas system would start to operate in 2004 or 2005. The development of the new system had many delays and setbacks, including the withdrawal of all three bidders in a 2005 tender; and the costs for the new system were far higher than budgeted. This led to the development of the Leap card platform from scratch; with the first cards becoming available to the general public in December 2011.

Prior to this, both Luas and Iarnród Éireann (in the Greater Dublin Area only) had rolled out their own, non-interoperable smartcard systems with both e-purse and long-term period pass options in 2005 and 2010 respectively. Additionally, Dublin Bus started providing long-term period passes on smartcards from 2009 but did not offer an e-purse option. Smartcard tickets were generally slightly cheaper than cash fares on these systems, but without any consistency or any multi-operator offerings. The reader infrastructure installed at tram stops, rail stations and buses from this period was all physically compatible with the Leap system when introduced and did not need replacement.

Initially, only discounted cash fare equivalents were offered; but the ability to load period passes to the card was added in 2013 with all Taxsaver products converted from paper or the operators' prior smartcards by 2014.

The fully integrated ticketing element of the project moved
closer in 2019. Greater Dublin Area fare capping was introduced for single operators in 2012 with a multi-operator cap introduced in 2013. A further step towards the planned 90-minute all-mode fare was introduced in 2015, with the Leap90 discount of €1 on each journey within 90 minutes of a prior journey.

As of late 2021, the Leap Card is fully integrated in the Dublin area, allowing 90 mins of travel across any combination of Dublin Bus, Luas and most Dart, commuter rail and Go-Ahead Ireland buses for a flat fare. This fare was originally €2.30 but it was decreased to €2 in May 2022 as part of measures to tackle the cost of living crises. In 2022, the fare was cut to €1 for students and those holding a Young Adult Leap card.

The Leap platform has also been used for the rollout of the Public Services Cards, allowing the replacement of the paper (rural) or paper + cardboard photocard (Dublin) Free Travel Pass for older people and those with disabilities. This removes the need to get a paper concessionary ticket issued for many rail journeys, reduces fraud opportunities and allows for the cancellation of passes.

Using the Leap Card 
Anonymous Leap cards can be purchased at Payzone outlets or from certain Luas or Irish Rail ticketing machines. A new card will cost €10 and that card will have an initial credit of €5. Value from an existing smart-card cannot be transferred onto a Leap Card, but it was possible to get a free Leap Card for holders of the 'old' Luas or Rail smart-cards until 30 September 2014. Personalised cards for use with period tickets are provided free-of-charge but without any credit. Customers can only use the card for e-purse transactions when the card is in credit; although a fare can bring the card to a negative balance of up to -€5.

Cards can be topped-up via Payzone outlets, or any Luas or Irish Rail ticketing machines, They can also be anonymously topped up, and recent ticket history viewed, using an app on a NFC-enabled compatible iPhone or Android smartphone.

It is also possible to reload a card using the Leap Card website, but it must then be registered online. When a Leap Card is registered, the cardholder can check their travel/purchase history online, but the card is no longer anonymous.

Transport operators

Acceptance has extended beyond the original three operators, and now covers

Ashbourne Connect
Bus Éireann - all non-Expressway services
City Direct
Collins Coaches
Dualway Coaches - certain scheduled services
Dublin Bus 
Go-Ahead Ireland
Iarnród Éireann - Greater Dublin and Cork Commuter services, point to point period passes
JJ Kavanagh - Route 139
Liffey Ferry
Matthews Coaches
Swords Express
Wexford Bus
TFI Local Link - Cavan-Monaghan, Longford-Westmeath-Roscommon, Waterford, Wexford and Galway only

Current capabilities 

The capabilities of the card have been extended to reach almost all groups. The following are currently in operation:
 Monthly and yearly passes. All the former Dublin Bus tickets were migrated to the Leap Card as well as the Luas year-passes and monthly Tax-Saver subscriptions. This process was completed in May 2014.
 Special fares for students and schoolchildren. This scheme was completed on 1 August 2014 with the new Personalised Child Leap Card for children 16 to 18 years of age. This card expires on the child's 19th birthday. Children from the age of 4 to the age of 15 use an Anonymous Child Leap Card. In August 2018, University College Dublin Students' Union suspended the sale of student Leap cards due to data privacy concerns.

Technical detail 

The Leap Card uses a chip inside the card that can be read from and written to without direct contact: a so-called proximity card or RFID card. The original Luas and Iarnród Éireann cards used the MIFARE classic card, which became notorious because of the ease with which they can be hacked into. Because of the security concerns of the Mifare classic the company that designed the card, NXP Semiconductors, have developed RFID cards that use a better encryption method. The RPA has not disclosed which card is being used for the Leap Card but scanning the card with a generic RFID reader shows it as a MIFARE DESFire EV1 (in detail: cardtype=ISO/IEC 14443-4 Smart Card, Mifare DESFire EV1 (MF3ICD41)). The terminals used in Dublin Bus (both the bus-driver terminal as well as the right-hand card reader), are made by Mifare/NXP and the 'pole terminals' are also made by Mifare (as the original Luas smart card is a Mifare classic).

While the Leap Card is a MiFare DESFire EV1, the standard (carton/paper) Dublin bus RFID tickets were using MiFare Ultralight (Type A (ISO/IEC 14443 Type A)) while the Rail Smart Card (Dublin short-hop zone) from Iarnród Éireann used the Mifare Classic 1k.

The Leap Card system has cost €55 million to date. However, since its launch in December 2011, it has had a turnover of €263 million as of April 2015. Later on, the National Transport Authority sought a partner to operate the Leap Card system on the authority's behalf. The partner would have to pull together the myriad facets required to operate the ITS, handling the complexities associated with the core financial process management (FPM), Contact Centre and card management functions. The National Transport Authority ended choosing DXC Technology. The company currently outsources NTA's integrated ticketing back-office operations, IT management, retail network and web portal delivery.

References 

Contactless smart cards
Fare collection systems
Transport in Ireland
2011 establishments in Ireland